Nucella lima, common name : the File Dog Winkle, is a species of sea snail, a marine gastropod mollusk in the family Muricidae, the murex snails or rock snails.

Distribution
This species is distributed in the Pacific Ocean from the Arctic to Baja California, Mexico; and along Northern Japan.

Description

The shell size varies between 19 mm and 51 mm.

References

External links
 

Muricidae
Gastropods described in 1791
Taxa named by Johann Friedrich Gmelin